Nicole Nau (born January 30, 1963) is a German dancer of Tango Argentino and Argentine folklore living in Argentina and Germany.

Life 

Nau was born in Düsseldorf, and after studying graphic design she first worked for advertising agencies before she settled in Argentina to be formally instructed as a professional dancer. In 1990 she had her first appearance in Café Homero to be followed by an engagement as a dancer in the opera MaratónTeatro Colón opera house in Buenos Aires.

In 2002 she had her premiere with the tango opera Orestes - Last Tango, which was created in a co-production with the WMTF Festival of Holland. It was here that she danced with Luis Pereyra for the first time who is her husband and dance partner now.

Under direction of Luis Pereyra she dances in the company El Sonido de mi Tierra and produces several own productions, as the last one, VIDA. In 2007 they reopened as the artistic directors the renowned tango theater Café de los Angelitos in Buenos Aires. In 2010 they are artistic directors at the Viejo Almacén and 2011 in Aqui Folklore.

She went on tour dancing through nearly all continents. Since 2016 Nicole Nau lives again in Germany where she runs her own stage productions.

Nau does the costume design for several Tango Argentino and Folklore Argentino productions.

Nau has published her book Tanze Tango mit dem Leben (Dance Tango with Life) at Bastei Verlag Lübbe at Frankfurt Buchmesse, 11.10.2013. The second edition has been printed in January 2014 .

Books 
 Nicole Nau: Tanze Tango mit dem Leben. Bastei Lübbe Verlag, Köln 2013, .
 Nicole Nau-Klapwijk: Tango Dimensionen, Kastell Verlag GmbH 1999, .
 Nicole Nau-Klapwijk: Tango, un baile bien porteño, Editorial Corregidor 2000,

Merits and tributes 
 1993: COMFER, Comité Federal de Radiodifusión, awarded her and her former partner Ricardo for their cultural contribution, handed over by León Guinsburg
 2000: a stamp of their own based on a photo taken by Máximo Parpagnoli, issued by the Argentinian postal service commemorating tango's 100. birthday (first issued on 11 November 2000).
 2001: a second stamp with the same photo and a new motif, issued by the Argentinian postal service on behalf of Japanese-Argentinian friendship on the occasion of the world stamp exhibition in Japan (first issued on 28 July 2001).
 2012: Tango Puro Argentino y Más has been declared as De Interés Cultural by Secretaría de Cultura de la Presidencia de la Nación, Ref.Expete.S.C.Nro 6020/12
2014: Nicole Nau & Luis Pereyra Company is nominated as Member of the International Dance Council CID | UNESCO by CID Präsident Dr. Alkis Raftis
 2016: VIDA! ARGENTINO - El Sonido de mi Tierra has been declared as DE ALTO INTERÉS ARTISTICO Y CULTURAL, Dirección General del Ministerio de Relaciones Exteriores y Culto el día 31 de mayo 2016, NOTA DICUL 273/2016

DVDs and CDs 
 2004: Curso de Tango & Folklore Argentino. ICARO Producciones. Nicole Nau & Luis Pereyra
 2004: El Sonido de mi Tierra. ICARO Producciones. Nicole Nau & Luis Pereyra
 2007: Bailando en Soledad Tango. DVD of the performance. Nicole Nau & Luis Pereyra
 2008: Secretos de la Danza. music of the Show, CD, Nicole Nau & Luis Pereyra
 2011: Tango Puro Argentino & Más, Show, DVD, Nicole Nau & Luis Pereyra. Apollo Varieté Theater Düsseldorf. Guido Gayk
 2012: Tango Puro Argentino & Más - with extraordinary company, DVD, Nicole Nau & Luis Pereyra and other artists. Theatre CCBorges. ICARO
 2012: El Sonido de mi Tierra, DVD, Nicole Nau & Luis Pereyra. Extraordinary company, Theatre Lünen Stadttheater. CAMEO
 2012: Nuestro Tango, Tutorial Video, DVD, Nicole Nau & Luis Pereyra. Guido Gayk

Selected appearances 
 1993: Maratón, directed by Jaime Kogan, Teatro Colón, Argentine
 1994: Festival Cosquín 34 edition - Argentina
 1994: Festival Villa Allende with Susana Rinaldi
 1996: Tour with Dala Sinfoniettan, Sweden
 1997: Japón ´97, Japan
 1999: WMTF Festival Holland, the Netherlands
 2003 - 2006: Viejo Almacén, traditional tango theater
 2009: Argentinísima, los 40 años, Julio Márbiz, choreography Luis Pereyra, Buenos Aires
 2011: Misa Criolla at the place of the Monumento a la Bandera, Rosario Argentina. Choreography, Dance and Percussion. Artists: the tenor Zamba Quipildor and Luis Lima.
 2011: Misa Criolla at the Plaza Mayor of Monte Grande Argentina. Choreography and Dance. Live transmission on TV by the Argentine channel C5N. Artists: Zamba Quipildor and the Oscar winner Soledad Villamil.
 2011: 7 Festival Internacional de Tango in Justo Daract, San Luis, Argentina. Choreography, Dance and Artistic Director for the Viejo Almacén. Live transmission by the Argentine Television Channel 26. Artists: Hugo Marcel and Nelly Vázquez.
2012: Festival de la Chacarera, Santiago del Estero
 2012: Carabajalazo in the City Center Rosario
 2012: SWR 3 Germany, Menschen der Woche, Frank Elstner
 2012: Performance in Laferrere with Chaqueño Palavecino, live on TV C5N 
 2012: Tango Puro Argentino y más! in Rio Turbio
 2013: Festival Cosquin with Claudio Pereyra Cordoba
 2013: Festival Cosquin Interpretation Vidala para mi Sombra with Oscar El Chaqueño Palavecino Cordoba
 2013: Viejo Almacen in Buenos Aires, special guests in the running since February 2013
 2013: Das Traumschiff, show on MS Deutschland
 2013: DAS! Abendmagazin, NDR TV Live Show 27.9.2013 
 2013: Tour 2013 El Sonido de mi Tierra - The great dance of Argentina. Premiere 29.9.2013
 2014: Presentation of the book of Nicole Nau Tanze Tango mit dem Leben in the German embassy, Buenos Aires Deutschen Botschaft Buenos Aires. The event was organized by ambassador Graf Bernhard von Waldersee and his wife Gräfin Katerina von Waldersee.
 2014: Tour in Europe VIDA 
 2015: Tour in Europe VIDA, World Forum Amsterdam
 2016: Bayerischen Filmpreis, with actors as Bruno Ganz, Till Schweiger, Uschi Glas
 Teatro Astral, Buenos Aires VIDA

Selected own productions 
 2002: Orestes – Last Tango, tango opera, choreography: Oscar Araiz, a co-production with WMTF Festival Holland
 2004 - 2005: El Sonido de mi Tierra, Choreografy Luis Pereyra – – Europe (e.g., Tonhalle Düsseldorf, Königliches Tropeninstitut Amsterdam (KIT), Teo Otto Theater Remscheid, NDT The Hague)
 2006: Bailando en Soledad, choreography Luis Pereyra - Europe, Argentine
 2007: Secretos de la Danza, choreography Luis Pereyra, Dramaturgy Julio López -  Europe, Argentine
 2009: El Color de mi Baile, choreography Luis Pereyra - Europe, Argentine
 2007 - 2010: Theatre Café de los Angelitos - El Tango, artistic direction, choreography Luis Pereyra - Buenos Aires
2010-2011: El Viejo Almacén Artistic Direction -Argentina
2011: Tango Puro Argentinogira por Europe
2011: Aqui!!! Folklore Teatro Astral, Buenos Aires Argentina. Co Dirección Artística con Luis Pereyra. Artistas: Cuti & Roberto Carabajal, El Chaqueño Palavecino, Suna Rocha, Zamba Quipildor, Leopoldo Federico, Mario Alvaréz Quiroga, Julia Elena Dávalos. Una creación de Julio Márbiz
2012: Tango Puro Argentino on board of the cruise ship MS Deutschland, Traumschiff. Artists: Carlos Galvan
2012: Cronica TV - Argentinisima La Peña de Martin Marbiz Artistic Direction of the TV Programm since 18.3.2012
 2012: Tango Puro Argentino y más! artistic direction, costume design and dance. Premiere in the Centro Cultural Borges, Buenos Aires on 17 June 2012 Further Tour through Europe, as Berlin Tipizelt, Theaterhaus Stuttgart, Konzerttheater Coesfeld
 2013: El Sonido de mi Tierra artistic direction, costume design and dance. Premiere in Teatro Sala Siranush, Buenos Aires 9 February 2013
 2013: Viejo Almacén, artistic direction since June 2013
 2014: Festival Cosquin Edition 54. Presentation with the own company El Sonido de mi Tierra.
 2014 y 2015: Tour through Europe with the own production VIDA, in over 70 venues, such as Musical Dome Köln, Colloseum Essen, Philharmonie München, Theaterhaus Stuttgart, World Forum The Hague, Kampnagel Hamburg
 2017: Tour in Europe with "VIDA! ARGENTINO". Derniere at Folies Bergère, Paris.
 2018: Tour in Europe "Vida!", Deutschland, Belgium, Netherland, Austria
 2018: Tour in Europe "Tanze Tango mit dem Leben", Germany, Switzerland
 2019: Tour in Europe "Vida!", Germany, Austria, Switzerland. 25 years Futuro Si at Tonhalle Düsseldorf
 2019: Tour in Europe "Se dice de mi", Germany, TV Programme in Austria and Germany
 2022: VIDA Tour in Argentina, Germany, Austria, Switzerland

References

External links 
 Nicole Nau at www.tangofolklore.com
 Nicole Nau at www.the-great-dance-of-argentina.de
 Review of ¡El tango!: Pablo Gorlero, Técnica y espectacularidad, 29. Juli 2007, in: La Nación
 Video Clip Café de los Angelitos - El Tango© 2007 - 2010 por Guido Gayk y Nicole Nau & Luis Pereyra
 Video Clip El Color de mi Baile, Tango Chacarera y mas© 2009 por Guido Gayk y Nicole Nau & Luis Pereyra
 Café de los Angelitos

Argentine female dancers
1963 births
Living people